The John C. and Barbara Steinman House is located in Monticello, Green County, Wisconsin.

History
John C. Steinman was active in various businesses, including serving as a partner in a general merchandise business. The house was listed on the State and the National Register of Historic Places in 2003.

References

Houses on the National Register of Historic Places in Wisconsin
National Register of Historic Places in Green County, Wisconsin
Houses in Green County, Wisconsin
Queen Anne architecture in Wisconsin
Houses completed in 1904